A ruka or ruca is a traditional Mapuche house type. Rukas were originally round with a conical roof. Rucas are typically built communally. Rukas traditionally lack windows and are made up a single open space in the interior. The interior of the rukas are organized around a central fireplace.

Travellers in the first half of the 20th century compared the housing conditions of rukas favourably to the tenements of Santiago and the countryside cottages of non-Mapuche Chilean farmers.

References

 Arquitectura MAPUCHE: la Ruca

House types
Mapuche culture
Mapuche words and phrases